Pléhédel is a commune in the Côtes-d'Armor department of Brittany in northwestern France.

Population

Inhabitants of Pléhédel are called pléhédelais in French.

Notable people 

 Boisgelin Family
 Charles Eugène, Comte de Boisgelin (1726–1791), Naval Officer and Vicomte & Governor of the town
 Alexandre-Joseph, Marquis de Boisgelin (1770–1821), Last personal bodyguard to Queen of France and Émigré officer

See also
Communes of the Côtes-d'Armor department

References

External links

Communes of Côtes-d'Armor